Tom Chabin is an American politician and a former Democratic member of the Arizona State Senate representing the 2nd District from his appointment in September 2007 until 2012. He served on the Coconino County Board of Supervisors from 1992 to 2000. He was a democratic nominee for the Arizona Corporation Commission in 2016.

External links
Ballotpedia

Living people
Democratic Party Arizona state senators
1951 births